Skra Częstochowa is a Polish football club based in Częstochowa, Poland. The club currently plays in the I liga, after having won promotion in 2021.

History 
The club was founded in 1926. In 1946, Skra became the champion of the Częstochowa district, which was why it was promoted to the Polish championships played in the cup system. In the Round of 16, the team lost 3-5 to Tęcza Kielce. In the 1947 season, Skra continued to play in the central games in the fight for the title of Polish Champion and qualification for the League in the 1948 season. The team took 7th place in the group, not being promoted to the League. Until 1952, the team played in the 2nd league. In the years 1950–1954 the club performed under the name of Ogniwo Częstochowa. In the years 1953-1966 the club played in the third league. In 2018, the club was promoted to the II Liga (level 3), and in 2021 to the I Liga (level 2).

Naming history
 1926 – Robotniczy Klub Sportowy (RKS) Skra Częstochowa
 1950 – Ogniwo Częstochowa
 1954 – Sparta Częstochowa
 1955 – Skra Częstochowa
 1974 – Międzyzakładowy Robotniczy Klub Sportowy (MRKS) Skra Barbara Częstochowa
 1978 – MRKS Skra Komobex Częstochowa
 1983 – MRKS Skra Częstochowa
 2006 – Klub Sportowy (KS) Skra Częstochowa

Current squad

Honours 

Championship
 1/8 of the finals: 1946
 7th place in the group: 1947

A Klasa, II Liga (Second Division)
 4th place in the final group: 1947/1948
 4th place in the group: 1949

Polish Cup
 1/32 of the finals: 2013/2014 (reserve team), 2021/2022

Stadium 

Skra plays their home games at the 990 capacity Miejski Stadion Piłkarski Skra in Częstochowa. Because their stadium didn’t meet the capacity requirements of the I liga, in the first part of the 2021/2022 season they played every home match on the opponent’s stadium, as the home team. From April 7, 2022, they play their home games at a substitute stadium GIEKSA Arena.

Former players

Jerzy Orłowski and Romuald Chojnacki played in the Polish national team, Titas Milašius played in Lithuania national team.

References 

Sport in Częstochowa
Football clubs in Silesian Voivodeship
Association football clubs established in 1926
1926 establishments in Poland